Héma-Québec is a non-profit organization that supplies blood and other biological products of human origin to hospitals for the Canadian province of Quebec. The organization's headquarters is located in the Montreal borough of Saint-Laurent, Quebec, and it was created on March 26, 1998 as a successor to the Canadian Red Cross Blood Program and the Canadian Blood Agency on recommendation of the Krever Commission.

As a supplier, Héma-Québec is responsible for recruiting donors and for collecting, testing and processing the blood products, and delivering them to hospitals.

Supplying cell and tissue products to hospitals is also an important component of its mandate. Héma-Québec is responsible for the  Stem Cell Donor Registry for Quebec and for the first Public Cord Blood Bank operating in Canada. It also collects, processes and distributes human tissues such as corneas, skin, bones, heart valves and tendons, and manages the only Public Human Tissue Bank in Quebec.

Héma-Québec also manages the only Public Mothers' Milk Bank in Quebec, whose purpose is to meet the needs of very premature newborns. It recruits and screen donors and then processes and tests the milk and distributes it to hospitals.

Plasmavie - Plasma Donor Lounges 
In November 2013, the first Plasmavie lounge specialized in collecting plasma opened its doors in Trois-Rivières. Since then, Héma-Québec has opened additional Plasmavie centres in Sherbrooke, Gatineau and Saguenay. The Saguenay and Gatineau centres also have space dedicated to whole blood donations. Plasmavie centres collect plasma by apheresis.

Plasma collected at the centres is processed to manufacture drugs such as immunoglobulins, which are used, for example, in the treatment of patients with immune system deficiencies.

Under the supervision of Héma-Québec, plasma is also fractionated and transformed into medications that are sold to Québec hospitals in the same way as standard blood products.

Human Tissues
Héma-Québec works to raise awareness among the public and hospital professionals about the importance of referring deceased donors for the collection of human tissues, including corneas. Héma-Québec also collects the tissues, transforms them and distributes them to hospitals.

Cord Blood Bank
Héma-Québec manages Québec’s only Public Cord Blood Bank. The organization recruits cord blood donor mothers, trains teams of midwives and obstetricians, and qualifies, transforms and stores the cord blood.

Mothers' Milk Bank
Since spring 2014, Héma-Québec has also been providing mothers’ milk to mothers of premature babies who are unable to breastfeed their newborn child.

Board Directors and committees 
Héma-Québec’s Board of Directors is composed of representatives of blood donation volunteers, hospital transfusion physicians, hospital administrators, the public health system, the research and business communities, and blood product recipients, as well as the organization’s President and CEO, Nathalie Fagnan. All members of the Board of Directors—with the exception of the President and CEO—are appointed by the Québec government following consultation with various authorities representing stakeholders in the transfusion chain. The President and CEO is appointed by Héma-Québec’s Board of Directors. The Board receives recommendations from three advisory committees:

 Safety Advisory Committee
 Scientific and Medical Advisory Committee
 Recipient Representatives Advisory Committee

See also
 Blood Donation
 Canadian Plasma Resources
 Canadian Blood Services - a separate organization operates elsewhere in Canada
 List of blood donation agencies

References

External links
 Official site 
 Official site 
 Héma-Québec Foundation

Medical and health organizations based in Quebec
Non-profit organizations based in Montreal
Saint-Laurent, Quebec
Blood banks in Canada